Trinchesia divanica is a species of sea slug, an aeolid nudibranch, a marine gastropod mollusc in the family Trinchesiidae.

Distribution
This species was described from Peter the Great Bay, Sea of Japan, Russia.

References

Trinchesiidae
Gastropods described in 2002